Highway 26 is a highway in the western portion of the Canadian province of Saskatchewan. The southernmost point is a junction with Highway 4, north of North Battleford.  From there, it runs generally northwest, including a 29 km concurrency with Highway 3 from just north of Turtleford to just south of St. Walburg, where it turns to a more northerly route (while Highway 3 continues west).  Highway 26 continues north until it terminates at a junction with Highway 224 and Highway 950, at the northern edge of the village of Goodsoil.

Route description
The southern  of the  Highway 26 runs beside a former Canadian Northern Railway (CNoR) branch line from Prince to St. Walburg, which CNoR built out from North Battleford and steadily extended until 1919. The rail line, and adjoining roads, caused a boom in the area, as early homesteaders were then able to deliver their production to grain elevators. The Canadian National Railway abandoned the entire branch line in 2005, when the remaining grain elevators closed, with grain now transported by truck on Highway 26.

Major attractions
Along Highway 26 these are a listing of lakes, big things, statues, historical markers, beaches, historical sites and buildings, national, regional and provincial parks.
 The Goodsoil Historical Museum Site, in Goodsoil, is a Municipal Heritage Property on the Canadian Register of Historic Places.
Makwa Lake Provincial Park
Makwa Lake
Jackfish Lake just to the east of route near Meota.
The Battlefords Provincial Park, which borders Jackfish Lake
Meadow Lake Provincial Park
Ernie the Turtle at Turtleford
Windmill at  Village of Edam

Imhoff Museum & Art Gallery at St. Walburg

St.Walburg & District Historical Museum at St. Walburg

Major intersections
From south to north:

See also 
Roads in Saskatchewan
Transportation in Saskatchewan

References

External links
Saskatchewan Highways Website—Highway Numbering 
Saskatchewan Road Map RV Itineraries 
Big Things of Canada, A Celebration of Community Monuments of Canada 

026